Beaver Brook State Park is an undeveloped public recreation area covering  in the towns of  Windham and Chaplin, Connecticut. The state park encompasses Bibbins Pond, also known as Beaver Brook Pond, as well as the acreage northward as far as the Air Line State Park Trail, which forms the park's northern boundary. The park is a walk-in facility, open for hunting and trout fishing, managed by the Connecticut Department of Energy and Environmental Protection.

History 
The park's name may derive from a once-present beaver pond. It was one of multiple public recreation areas acquired in the 1950s using funds bequeathed for that purpose by George Dudley Seymour. When the gift was announced in 1955, it was reported that trout pools had already been developed north of Bibbins Pond. The annually produced State Register and Manual noted the park's acreage at 165 acres in 1955, at 391 acres in 1957, and at 401 acres in 1960. The state record for brook trout was claimed for Bibbins Pond from 1994 to 1998.

Activities and amenities
Bibbins Pond, known as Beaver Brook Pond, is the park's central feature, while Beaver Brook runs both north and south of the pond and continues beyond the park limits. Bibbins Pond's  offer a seasonal boat launch for non-motorized watercraft and trout fishing. The park also includes a geocache which can be accessed via three different routes.

References

External links

 Beaver Brook State Park Connecticut Department of Energy and Environmental Protection

State parks of Connecticut
Parks in Windham County, Connecticut
Chaplin, Connecticut
Windham, Connecticut
Protected areas established in 1955
1955 establishments in Connecticut